Piecnik  (formerly German Petznick) is a village in the administrative district of Gmina Mirosławiec, within Wałcz County, West Pomeranian Voivodeship, in north-western Poland.

Until 1948, the area was part of Germany. For the history of the region, see History of Pomerania.

References

Piecnik